Radio 92.9 EarthFest is a free music festival that features both national and local acts. The concert averages 125,000 people yearly, hosts 14 bands on 3 stages, and is the largest radio station "Earth" or "Green" related event in New England.

Background
The Radio 92.9 EarthFest concert is a free music festival that is hosted yearly on the Esplanade in downtown Boston, MA. The concert was created to demonstrate how everyday individuals can reduce their environmental impact. The concert is supported by a variety of sponsors such as Whole Foods Market, Subaru, MetroPCS, and Boston Globe. These sponsors, along with the 51 other sponsors, set up booths and offer free items to promote their products and demonstrate to concert attendees how their products will aid both the individual, and the environment as a whole. The Radio 92.9 EarthFest concert will celebrate its 23rd event on Saturday May 21, 2016.
Along with the main outdoor stage on the Hatch Shell, EarthFest offers a smaller stage in an area known as Kid's Planet, which is set up for families and a younger audience. Notable performers in years past have been KT Tunstall, The Fray, Los Lonely Boys, and Shawn Mullins. Each year the concert will host 14 bands that range from locally to nationally known. More recently, in 2012, the Earthfest Audience was estimated to be over 200,000 people by state police.

Previous performers
2016:
- Fitz and the Tantrums
- Joywave
- The Strumbellas
- Flight of Fire

2015:
- Guster
- New Politics
- Atlas Genius
- Hunter
 
2014:
- Neon Trees
- The Wailers
- Smallpools 
- Morning Parade 
- Venetia Fair

2013:
- Vertical Horizon
- Cracker
- Gentlemen Hall 
- Fastball 
- Camper Van Beethoven
- Todd Biggins Band

2012:
- Third Eye Blind
- Spin Doctors
- Switchfoot
- Eve6
- Twin Berlin

2011:
- Ed Kowalczyk
- OK Go
- Sponge
- Atomic Tom
- The Ground Up

2010:
- Collective Soul
- Gin Blossoms
- Crash Kings
- Marcy Playground
- Jackson Wetherbee Band

2009:
- Soul Asylum
- The Lemonheads
- Shawn Mullins
- Seven Mary Three
- Red Summer Sun

2008
- The Help
- BoDeans
- The English Beat
- Cracker
- Cake

2007
- KT Tunstall
- Guster
- Mat Kearney
- Jon Butler Trio
- Vega4

2006
- The Alternate Routes
- The Fray
- James Blunt
- Los Lonely Boys

2005
- Ari Hest
- Anna Nalick
- Low Millions
- Five for Fighting
- Carbon leaf
- The Wallflowers

2004: 
- Peter Wolf
- Third Eye Blind
- Edie Brickell
- Los Lonely Boys
- Bodeans

2003: 
– Sheryl Crow
- Big Head Todd & the Monsters
- Peter Wolf
- Sister Hazel
- Nickel Creek
- Alice Peacock

References

External links
 EarthFest Home Page

Environmental festivals
Festivals in Boston
May events
Rock festivals in the United States